Zhenjiang Suning Plaza is a building complex in Zhenjiang, China. Tower 1 of the complex is a supertall skyscraper.

See also
List of tallest buildings in China

References

Skyscrapers in Jiangsu
Buildings and structures under construction in China
Buildings and structures in Zhenjiang
Skyscraper office buildings in China
Residential skyscrapers in China
Skyscraper hotels in China